Gullrock Lake is a lake in Kenora District in northwestern Ontario, Canada.

See also
List of lakes in Ontario

References
 National Resources Canada

Lakes of Kenora District